Pierre-Raymond-Léonard Martineau (February 8, 1857 – August 31, 1903) was a lawyer, prothonotary and political figure in Quebec. He represented Montmagny in the House of Commons of Canada from 1898 to 1903 as a Liberal.

He was born in Montmagny, Canada East, the son of Louis Martineau and Adélaide Letellier. Martineau was admitted to the bar in 1882 and set up practice in Montmagny. He was prothonotary for Montmagny district from 1888 to 1896. Martineau was first elected to the House of Commons in an 1898 by-election held after Philippe-Auguste Choquette was named a judge. He died in office in Ottawa at the age of 46.

References 

Members of the House of Commons of Canada from Quebec
Liberal Party of Canada MPs
1857 births
1903 deaths